Kramer-Werke GmbH is a manufacturer of compact construction machines, such as wheel loaders, tele wheel loaders and telehandlers located in Pfullendorf (Baden-Württemberg), Germany. Formerly, it was one of the pioneer in tractor manufacturing. It is part of the Wacker Neuson group.

History

Founding in 1925 until stop of the tractor production in 1973
In 1925 the brothers Kramer started to develop and produce mowing machines and Tractors in Gutmadingen, Germany. These were the first ones built in Germany and a revolution in agricultural work. The company headquarters was moved to Überlingen (Bodensee) in 1952.

In the time from 1957 to 1958, a special department for industrial and construction machines was set up. It caused a sensation, when Kramer introduced in 1968 the first German wheel loader with four-wheel drive and equal sized tires. A lot other four-wheel steered machines followed this example.

In 1973 an important change of direction occurred, when the company decided to close down the "tractor" manufacturing division of the business and focussed on construction machines. At this time the global tractor manufacturing business was changing with local companies suffering reduced market share as the major players consolidated and average tractor horse power increased. Many of the post war European tractor manufactures failed.

Concentration on construction equipment 1974 until 2000 
In 1987 the companies focus was adjusted to the four-wheel steering based models. The same year the Kramer 312 SL was the first wheel loader with four-wheel steering which was manufactured in serial production.

2000 onwards 
In 2000 the merger between Kramer-Werke GmbH and Neuson Baumaschinen GmbH took place. Within this year, the company was renamed to Neuson Kramer Baumaschinen GmbH, which was situated in Linz

Since 2005 Kramer is producing telehandlers for the agricultural machinery manufacturer Claas. As part of this cooperation Claas acquired a minority interest in Kramer.

In March 2007 the merger between the Wacker Construction Equipment AG, Munich and the Neuson Kramer Baumaschinen AG was announced.
Following this merger the Wacker Neuson SE was created.

On April 5, 2007 the company began to build a 30 million Euro facility in Pfullendorf. The new production site has an area of about 16 hectare and the facility itself offers 160.000 square meters of factory space. The possible annual production capacity rises from 1000 to 6000 machines.

Locations 
 Pfullendorf, Germany (production, administration, research & development)

Products 

Wheel loaders
Tele wheel loaders
Telehandlers

Literature 
 Walter Sack: Kramer Traktoren. Podszun Verlag. März 2006. 
 Agrarvideo: "Kramer. Der Allesschaffer vom Bodensee", Firmen- und Trakorengeschichte auf DVD, http://www.agrarvideo.de/kramer-die-allesschaffer-vom-bodensee.html

References

External links 

 Homepage of Kramer-Werke GmbH

Construction equipment manufacturers of Germany
German brands
Manufacturing companies established in 1925
German companies established in 1925